Fox Ridge State Park is an Illinois state park on  in Coles County, Illinois, United States. The State of Illinois took over ownership of the park sometime in the 1930s.

References

State parks of Illinois
Protected areas of Coles County, Illinois
1930s establishments in Illinois
Protected areas established in the 1930s